Kwak Jin-eon (born October 23, 1991) is a South Korean singer and songwriter. He was the winner of Superstar K6 in 2014. He released his first album, Go With Me on May 10, 2016.

Discography

Studio album

Extended plays

Singles

Soundtrack appearances

Other charted songs

Filmography

Radio show

References

External links

1991 births
Living people
K-pop singers
South Korean pop singers
South Korean rhythm and blues singers
Superstar K winners
Music Farm artists
Dong-ah Institute of Media and Arts alumni
21st-century South Korean male  singers
South Korean male singer-songwriters